n-Butylmercuric chloride is an organic mercury salt that is used as a catalyst and a precursor to other oganomercuric compounds.

Preparation 
n-Butylmercuric chloride is made by reacting n-butylmagnesium bromide with mercury chloride.

It can also be prepared by reacting 1-butene with mercury acetate.

References 

Mercury(II) compounds
Organomercury compounds